Luigi Guardigli (20 July 1923 – 19 September 2008) was an Italian painter and mosaicist.

Biography
Guardigli was born in Ravenna. At 18, he enrolled in and attended the School of Fine Arts of Ravenna. During World War II he was drafted and served from 1943 until 1946 in the Regia Marina (Italian Royal Navy) at La Spezia). After the war, Guardigli returned to the School of Fine Arts, receiving his diploma in 1948. He enrolled in the School of Painting and Mosaics, also in Ravenna, graduating in 1951. From 1951 to 1955, Guardigli worked with the Gruppo mosaicisti of Ravenna and restored many mosaics. Also in 1951, at the end of November, he arrived in Paris to teach at the Ecole d'Art Italien (School of Italian Art) as an assistant to the painter Gino Severini, founder and director of the school.	Together with another mosaicist, his fellow Ravennan Lino Melano, Guardigli executed mosaic works for artists including Fernand Léger, Georges Braque, Marc Chagall, Jean Bazaine, and Raoul Ubac. He collaborated also on the mosaic for the façade of the Musée national Fernand Léger in Biot (Alpes-Maritimes). In 1960, Guardigli executed, at the Colombe d'Or of Saint-Paul-de-Vence, a mosaic by the painter Georges Braque. From 1961, he had a studio in the artists' residence La Ruche at 2, passage de Dantzing in Paris, the place described by Lorenzo Viani in the book Parigi 1925 (Paris 1925), published by Fratelli Treves. In 1962, in another collaboration with Braque, Guardigli created the famous long fish tank of the Fondation Maeght in St Paul de Vence. His collaborations with many illustrious artists continued; the last was Jean-Michel Folon. Many of his personal works in painting and mosaics are in prominent private and public collections. The latter portion of his life was spent in an old people's rest home in Paris, where Guardigli died in 2008.

Some works

 1958 "Société d'Aquitaine" – Mosaic created from designs by A. Beaudin, Paris
 1958 "Musée Leger" – Mosaic created with Melano Leger, Biot
 1959 "F Noain" – Mosaic created from designs by Suzanne Roge, Paris
 1959 "l'Usine d'embouteillage" – Mosaic created from designs by Raoul Ubac, Évian-les-Bains
 1960 "Colombe d'Or" – Mosaic created from designs by Georges Braque, Saint-Paul-de-Vence
 1961 "France" – Mosaic created from designs by Jean René Bazaine, Paris
 1962 "Fondazione Maeght" – Mosaic created from designs by Georges Braque, Saint-Paul-de-Vence
 1963 "Maison de la radio" – Mosaic created from designs by J. Bazaine, Paris
 1963 "Maison d'architecte" – Mosaic created from designs by J. Bazaine, Septeuil, Yvelines
 1963 "Clinique Universitaire" – Mosaic created from designs by J. Lacasse, Freiburg im Breisgau
 1963 "Maison d'architecte" – Mosaic created from designs by J. Bazaine, Septeuil, Yvelines
 1964 "groupe scolaire" – Mosaic created from designs by W. Mucha, Pyrenees
 1965 "CNRS" – Mosaic created from designs by Jullien, Grenoble
 1965 "Hotel rue de l'Elysée" – Mosaic created from designs by Marc Chagall, Paris
 1965 "Musée d'Art Mural de Lund – Mosaic created from designs by J. Bazaine, Sweden
 1966 "Nuovo Parlamento di Gerusalemme" – Mosaic created from designs by Marc Chagall, Israel
 1966 "Maison des Jeunes" – Mosaic created from designs by Fernand Léger, Corbeil-Essonnes

References

Sources
Jeanine Warnod, La Ruche & Montparnasse'' – 1978 Weber (Geneva, Paris)
Comite de defense de La Ruche, "Il faut sauver 'La Ruche'" – April 1969
Felice Nittolo, "Maestri Mosaicisti a Ravenna prima e dopo la seconda guerra mondiale" – 2006 casa editrice Girasole arte.
ravennanotizie.it, "E' morto a Parigi il mosaicista ravennate Luigi Guardigli" – 29 September 2008

Mosaic artists
2008 deaths
1923 births
20th-century Italian painters
Italian male painters
20th-century Italian male artists